The 1983–84 SK Rapid Wien season was the 86th season in club history.

Squad

Squad and statistics

Squad statistics

Fixtures and results

League

Cup

European Cup

References

1983-84 Rapid Wien Season
Rapid